Casearia lasiophylla is a species of flowering plant in the family Salicaceae. It is endemic to Brazil.

References

Flora of Brazil
lasiophylla
Data deficient plants
Taxonomy articles created by Polbot